Don't Metal With Evil is the debut studio album by American heavy metal band Halloween. Released in 1985, it was recorded from 1983-1985 in Detroit, Michigan. The album was re-released on Killer Metal Records on vinyl LP and cd with different bonus tracks.

Track listing
All tracks written by Halloween except where stated.

Bonus tracks on 2008 German re-release 

The bonus tracks on the cd version were originally released on Vicious Demo (1990).

All live tracks were recorded at Harpo's Concert Theatre on August 2, 1985.

Personnel
Band Members
 Brian Thomas – lead vocals
 Rick Craig – lead guitar, vocals
 George Neal – bass, vocals
 Bill Whyte – drums

Production
 Halloween – producer
 Greg Reilly – engineer
 Mike Harrell – engineer

References

Halloween (band) albums
1985 debut albums